Milber is a housing estate at  considered part of the town of Newton Abbot in south Devon. It is on the opposite side of the A380 road from the town centre. Milber contains mainly houses, but also a trading estate and some shops. The estate is part of the electoral ward termed Buckland and Milber. The population at the 2011 census was 7,089.  Its unusual 20th-century church of St Luke was built as a result of a dream experienced by William Keble Martin in 1931. It is partly circular in form with three naves and was completed in 1942.

Some of the roads in Milber are named after trees - Hazel Close, Beechwood Avenue and Chestnut Drive being examples of this. The narrow, half mile-long, strip of Ben Stedham's Wood separates Milber from the suburbs of Aller and Newtake: the Iron Age hill fort of Milber Down is at the top of this wood.

References

External links
The Anglican Parish

Newton Abbot